Dunđerski Palace is a palace in Čelarevo, Serbia. It was built by the Dunđerski family and is currently under reconstruction. Palace was declared a Monument of Culture of Exceptional Importance in 1983, and it is protected by the Republic of Serbia.

See also
Fantast Castle
Tourism in Serbia

References 

Cultural Monuments of Exceptional Importance (Serbia)
Buildings and structures in Vojvodina
Bačka Palanka
Palaces in Serbia
Manor houses in Serbia